The 2022–23 Virginia Cavaliers men's basketball team represented the University of Virginia during the 2022–23 NCAA Division I men's basketball season. The team was led by head coach Tony Bennett in his 14th year and played their home games at John Paul Jones Arena in Charlottesville, Virginia, as members of the Atlantic Coast Conference. They finished the season with an 25–8 record, 15–5 in ACC play, to finish in a tie for first place and clinch a share of their sixth regular season title in ten seasons, and their eleventh ACC regular season title in school history. They defeated North Carolina and Clemson to reach the championship game of the ACC tournament, where they lost to Duke. They received a bid to NCAA tournament as the No. 4 seed in the East region, where they were upset in the First Round by Furman.

Previous season
The 2021–22 Cavaliers finished the season 21–14, 12–8 in ACC Play to finish in 6th place. They defeated Louisville in the Second Round of the ACC Tournament before losing in the quarterfinals to North Carolina. They received an at-large bid to the National Invitation Tournament where they defeated Mississippi State and North Texas to advance to the quarterfinals where they lost to St. Bonaventure.

The Cavaliers did not qualify for the NCAA Tournament for the first time since 2012–13 to end their disappointing season.

Offseason

Departures

Incoming transfers

2022 recruiting class

^ESPN has not released its team rankings for 2022.

Roster

Players

Coaches

Schedule and results

|-
!colspan=12 style=""| Summer Tour: Cavaliers in Italy

|-
!colspan=12 style=""| Regular Season

|-
!colspan=12 style=""| ACC Tournament

|-
!colspan=12 style=""| NCAA tournament

Rankings

*AP does not release post-NCAA Tournament rankings

References

Virginia Cavaliers men's basketball seasons
Virginia
Virginia Cavaliers men's basketball team
Virginia Cavaliers men's basketball team

Virginia